The Servant of God Ruben Isidro Alonso, S.D.B., popularly known as Padre Cacho (1929–1992) was a Uruguayan Roman Catholic priest.

Alonso was born in Montevideo. A famous streetwise priest, he worked with the poorest people in Uruguay, residing with them in the cantegriles. In 2014, the Uruguayan archbishop Daniel Sturla asked the Pope for the canonization of Alonso.

References

External links
 
  Canción dedicada al Padre Cacho. Compuesta e interpretada por el cantautor uruguayo Numa Moraes
 Sitio web de la Organización San Vicente – Obra Padre Cacho

1929 births
1992 deaths
People from Montevideo
Salesians of Don Bosco
Poverty in Uruguay
20th-century Uruguayan Roman Catholic priests
Uruguayan Servants of God
Salesian Servants of God
Burials at the Cementerio del Norte, Montevideo